Lysimachia foemina is commonly known as blue pimpernel or poor man's weatherglass, and was formerly called Anagallis foemina. It is a low-growing annual herbaceous plant in the genus Lysimachia of the family Primulaceae. In a comparison of DNA sequences, L. foemina was shown to be most closely related to L. monelli. It had been thought by many to be closest to L. arvensis, and some authors had even included L. foemina as a subspecies of L. arvensis, as  Anagallis arvensis subsp foemina. These three species (L arvensis, L foemina and L monelli) were among several transferred from Anagallis to Lysimachia in a 2009 paper.

Etymology
The previous genus name Anagallis derives from the Greek words  meaning "again" and  meaning "to delight in", possibly referring to the fact that these plants produce flowers twice in a year and the flowers open whenever the sun strikes them. The species epithet  means "female" and refers to the small size of the plant and the gentleness of its appearance. The common name refers to the fact that the flowers close at the approaching of the bad weather.

Description

They have five lanceolate sepals and five petals. The flowering period extends from April to October. The hermaphroditic flowers are pollinated by insects (entomogamy).

This species is very similar to the related Lysimachia arvensis, and has been regarded as a subspecies of L arvensis. In 2007, a molecular phylogenetic study showed that Lysimachia foemina is more closely related to Lysimachia monelli than to Lysimachia arvensis, and should be treated as a separate species.

Lysimachia foemina can be distinguished from Lysimachia arvensis on the basis of the hairiness and arrangement of the petals and by the length of the flower stalk. This species has just a few glandular hairs on the margins of the petals, clearly separated from one another (never imbricate). Furthermore the flower stalk is shorter. The colour of the flowers is not a useful diagnostic character.

Distribution
This cosmopolitan plant is native to central and southern Europe and has been introduced in Africa, northern and eastern Asia, North and South America and western Australia.

Habitat
It grows in scrub, uncultivated soils and grasslands.

References

External links
 Biolib
 Schede di botanica
 Cretanvista

foemina
Flora of Europe
Plants described in 1768